The Lianshui River, also known as Luoma River or Ganxi River, is a left-bank tributary in the middle reaches of the Xiang River in Hunan. The river rises in Pingshang Town of Xinshao County. Its main stream runs generally west to east through Xinshao, Lianyuan, Louxing, Shuangfeng, Xiangxiang, Yuhu and Xiangtan counties and joins the Xiang at Hekou of Xiangtan.

References

Rivers of Hunan